Kichuga is a rural locality (a settlement) in Opokskoye Rural Settlement, Velikoustyugsky District, Vologda Oblast, Russia. The population was 35 as of 2002.

Geography 
Kichuga is located 51 km southwest of Veliky Ustyug (the district's administrative centre) by road. Verkhnyaya Kichuga is the nearest rural locality.

References 

Rural localities in Velikoustyugsky District